The Bedford Lunatic Asylum was a mental health facility. It opened in 1812 and closed in 1860.

History 
Samuel Whitbread headed the committee which commissioned the asylum. The Bedford Lunatic Asylum, designed by John Wing, was opened in April 1812. In 1845, the UK parliament passed a new act requiring that counties either build their own asylums or operate an asylum jointly with another county. Many other counties did not build asylums like Bedford, so there were now twice as many inmates in the asylum and not enough staff to help with their needs. Bedford's neighbouring counties, Hertfordshire and Huntingdonshire, then sent patients to Bedford. In 1860 the three counties combined asylums in Fairfield Hospital near Arlesey and the Bedford Lunatic Asylum closed soon after.

Renovation 
The site of the asylum is now a residential building. The bodies of patients that died at the hospital are now buried underneath the children's playground.

See also
 Healthcare in Bedfordshire

References

Further reading

External links
 Asylum projects - Bedford Hospital

1812 establishments in England
1860 disestablishments in England
Former psychiatric hospitals in England
Hospital buildings completed in 1812
Hospitals in Bedfordshire
History of Bedfordshire
Defunct hospitals in England
Hospitals established in 1812
Buildings and structures in Bedford